Hypercyclic morphogenesis refers to the emergence of a higher order of self-reproducing structure or organization or hierarchy within a system, first introduced by J. Barkley Rosser, Jr. in 1991 (Chap. 12).  It involves combining the idea of the hypercycle, an idea due to Manfred Eigen and Peter Schuster (1979) with that of morphogenesis, an idea due to D’Arcy W.Thompson (1917).  The hypercycle involves the problem in biochemistry of molecules combining in a self-reacting group that is able to stay together, posited by Eigen and Schuster as the foundation for the emergence of multi-cellular organisms.  Thompson saw morphogenesis as a central part of the development of an organism as cell differentiation led to new organs appearing as it develops and grows.  Alan Turing (1952) would study the chemistry and mathematics involved in such a process, which would also be studied mathematically by René Thom (1972) in his formulation of catastrophe theory.

	Rosser suggested applications in political economy such as the emergence of the European Union out of the conscious actions of the leaders of its constituent nation states (1992), or the appearance of a higher level in an urban hierarchy during economic development (1994).  It has been applied to the emergence of higher levels in an ecological hierarchy (Rosser, Folke, Günther, Isomäki, Perrings, and Puu, 1994), and it can be argued that the final stage of such a development for combined ecologic-economic systems would be the noosphere of Vladimir I. Vernadsky (1945).

References
J. Barkley Rosser, Jr. From Catastrophe to Chaos: A General Theory of Economic Discontinuities. Boston/Dordrecht: Kluwer Academic Publishers, 1991.
Manfred Eigen and Peter Schuster. The Hypercycle: A Principle of Natural Self-Organization. Berlin: Springer-Verlag, 1979.
D’Arcy W. Thompson. On Growth and Form. Cambridge, UK: Cambridge University Press.
Alan M. Turing. “The Chemical Basis of Morphogenesis.” Philosophical Transactions of the Royal Society B August 14, 1952, 237, pp. 37–72.
René Thom. Stabilité Structurelle et Morphogenèses: Essai d’une Théorie Générale des Modèles. New York: Benjamin, 1972 (English translation, Structural Stability and Morphogenesis: An Outline of a Theory of Models. Reading: Benjamin, 1975).
J. Barkley Rosser, Jr. “The Dialogue between the Economic and Ecologic Theories of Evolution.” Journal of Economic Behavior and Organization March 1992, 17(3), pp. 195–215.
J. Barkley Rosser, Jr. “Dynamics of Emergent Urban Hierarchy.” Chaos, Solitons & Fractals April 1994, 4(4), pp. 553–562.
J. Barkley Rosser, Jr., Carl Folke, Günther Folke, Heikki Isomäki, Charles Perrings, and *Tönu Puu. “Discontinuous Change in Multilevel Hierarchical Systems.” Systems Research 1994, 11(3), pp. 77–94.
Vladimir I. Vernadsky. “The Biosphere and the Noosphere.” Scientific American January 1945, 33(1), pp. 1–12.

Developmental biology
Mathematical and theoretical biology